Acraepheus (Ancient Greek: Ἀκραιφεύς) was, in Greek mythology, a son of Apollo to whom the foundation of the town of Acraephnium, a Boeotian town on the lake Copais, was ascribed. In Acraephnium, Apollo was attached with the epithet Acraephius or Acraephiaeus by worshipers. Acraepheus could have been father of Ptous by Euxippe.

Notes

References 

 Stephanus of Byzantium, Stephani Byzantii Ethnicorum quae supersunt, edited by August Meineike (1790-1870), published 1849. A few entries from this important ancient handbook of place names have been translated by Brady Kiesling. Online version at the Topos Text Project.

Children of Apollo
Demigods in classical mythology
Boeotian characters in Greek mythology